Bang Nam Priao is the northwesternmost district (amphoe) of Chachoengsao province, central Thailand.

History
The old location of the district center of Bang Nam Priao was in Ban Ton Samrong, Bang Khanak Subdistrict. In 1905 the government built the first district office in Bang Nam Priao. In 1952 the government built a new office on the north bank of Khlong Bang Khanak (last phase of Khlong Saen Saeb). The present district office was built in 1997.

Etymology & population
Its name "Bang Nam Priao" literally translates as "a place where water has a sour taste". It is said that in the past the soil of this area is sour. Therefore, the water has a sour taste as well.

The population of Bang Nam Priao is a mix of people of various races and religions, including Thai Buddhists, Thai Chinese, Muslims, Mons and Christians.

Geography
Neighbouring districts are (from the southeast clockwise): Khlong Khuean, Mueang Chachoengsao of Chachoengsao Province; Nong Chok of Bangkok; Lam Luk Ka of Pathum Thani province; Ongkharak of Nakhon Nayok province; and Ban Sang of Prachinburi province.

The important water resources are the Bang Pakong River and Khlong Saen Saeb.

Administration

Central administration 
Bang Nam Priao is divided into 10 subdistricts (tambons), which are further subdivided into 148 administrative villages (mubans).

Local administration 
There are six subdistrict municipalities (thesaban tambon) in the district:
 Khlong Saen Saep consisting of parts of subdistrict Bang Khanak.
 Don Chimphli consisting of parts of subdistrict Don Chimphli.
 Bang Khanak consisting of parts of subdistrict Bang Khanak.
 Bang Nam Priao consisting of parts of subdistricts Bang Nam Priao and Phrong Akat.
 Sala Daeng consisting of parts of subdistrict Sala Daeng.
 Don Ko Ka consisting of subdistrict Don Ko Ka.

There are eight subdistrict administrative organizations (SAO) in the district:
 Bang Nam Priao consisting of parts of subdistrict Bang Nam Priao.
 Singto Thong consisting of subdistrict Singto Thong.
 Mon Thong consisting of subdistrict Mon Thong.
 Bueng Nam Rak consisting of subdistrict Bueng Nam Rak.
 Yothaka consisting of subdistrict Yothaka.
 Don Chimphli consisting of parts of subdistrict Don Chimphli.
 Sala Daeng consisting of parts of subdistrict Sala Daeng.
 Phrong Akat consisting of parts of subdistrict Phrong Akat.

References

External links
amphoe.com (Thai)

Bang Nam Priao